The Houston Journal of Health Law & Policy is a biannual, open access, peer-reviewed, student-run, law journal covering issues in health law and policy. It was established in 2001 and is affiliated with the Health Law and Policy Institute at the University of Houston Law Center, in the United States. 

Each year, the fall issue is dedicated to a symposium organized by the journal that focuses on an emerging topic in health care law and policy. The journal's spring issue includes articles on a variety of topics.

Editors-in-chief 
The following persons have been editor-in-chief of the journal:

External links 
 

American law journals
Health law journals
University of Houston
Publications established in 2001
English-language journals
Biannual journals